Stenochlaena is a genus of ferns of the plant family Blechnaceae. Six species were formally accepted in an April 2013 scientific review of the genus, first written some years earlier and submitted in 2009. One additional species S. hainanensis awaits confirmation of its difference from S. palustris by means of differences in fertile material and/or its formal publication. One additional likely species grows naturally in Cameroon, Africa, recognised with the descriptive name Stenochlaena sp. 'Cameroon' but it awaits formal description.

Some species of Stenochlaena are common as climbing ferns in South-East Asian rainforests. After the end-Cretaceous mass extinction caused by an asteroid impact, a species of Stenochlaena was essentially the only common plant across North America for several thousand years.

Stenochlaena palustris is known as midin in Sarawak, Malaysia and it is eaten as a popular vegetable similar to fiddlehead ferns, which is usually flavoured with shrimp paste. In India and parts of Indonesia, it is flavoured and eaten with garlic cloves. In South Kalimantan it is called kalakai.

Species

Southern India, Indochina, Malaysia, Papuasia, Northern Australia and Southwestern Pacific

Stenochlaena areolaris 
Stenochlaena cumingii 
Stenochlaena hainanensis  ?  ⇒  S. palustris 
Stenochlaena milnei 
Stenochlaena palustris

Africa and African Islands

Stenochlaena mildbraedii 
Stenochlaena sp. 'Cameroon' 
Stenochlaena tenuifolia

References

Blechnaceae
Fern genera
Taxonomy articles created by Polbot